Meghan Gallacher (born 17 January 1992) is a British politician who has served as Deputy Leader of the Scottish Conservatives since 2022. She has been a Member of the Scottish Parliament (MSP) for the Central Scotland region since 2021. Gallacher was a councillor for the Motherwell West ward from 2017 to 2022, serving as the Conservatives party's group leader in the North Lanarkshire Council.

Early life

Education 
Meghan Gallacher was born on 17 January 1992 in Bellshill, North Lanarkshire and was brought up in nearby Holytown. She studied political science and government at the Hamilton Campus (now New Lanarkshire Campus) of the University of the West of Scotland from 2010 to 2014. In her final year of university, she wrote her dissertation on the "decline of the Conservative Party from Margaret Thatcher to the present day and the impact [of then Scottish Conservatives leader] Ruth Davidson". She graduated with a BA.

Early career 
While studying at university, Gallacher worked part-time at John Lewis and Partners in customer service. In 2014, after graduating, she worked full-time at the company for two years. She served as a Customer Relations Case Manager, dealing with customer concerns at CEO level. In September 2016, she left John Lewis to work as a Parliamentary Researcher for Edward Mountain, the MSP for the Highlands and Islands region.

Early political involvement 
Gallacher grew up in a predominantly left-wing community that had resentment towards the Conservative Party for closing down steelworks. This was the typical ideology of many Scottish industrial heartlands, but Gallacher believed it was the Conservatives were vital in future prosperity for communities like hers. Her grandmother, Elizabeth McLeod, stood unsuccessfully in various elections to the North Lanarkshire Council. After attending an association meeting with her grandmother, Gallacher joined the Scottish Conservatives. 

Gallacher first stood for election in 2015 at Thorniewood ward by-election for North Lanarkshire Council, she was eliminated at Stage 5 of the count. The following year, she stood for the Motherwell and Wishaw constituency at the 2016 Scottish Parliament election, finishing in third place. She was also the fifth placed Conservative candidate for the Central region, but was not elected.

Political career

North Lanarkshire Council (2017–2022) 
Gallacher was elected to North Lanarkshire Council for the Motherwell West ward in 2017, she subsequently became the party's group leader.

At the 2015, 2017 and 2019 UK general elections, she stood for the Motherwell and Wishaw constituency, finishing third on all three occasions.

Election to Holyrood 
She was elected to the Scottish Parliament in 2021 for the Central Scotland region, elected through the regional list vote. She had also stood for the Hamilton, Larkhall and Stonehouse constituency.

On 12 January 2022, Gallacher called for Boris Johnson to resign as Conservative party leader and Prime Minister over the Westminster lockdown parties controversy along with a majority of Scottish Conservative MSPs.

Deputy Leader of the Scottish Conservatives (2022–present) 
On 9 May 2022, she was announced as the new deputy leader of the Scottish Conservatives, following on from the 2022 Scottish local elections.

Personal life
Gallacher is engaged to Graeme McGinnigle, a former East Dunbartonshire councillor who she met at a Conservative Party reception. She gave birth to their first child, a daughter called Charlotte, on 10 July 2022.

Notes

References

External links 
 

1992 births
Living people
Politicians from North Lanarkshire
Alumni of the University of the West of Scotland
Conservative MSPs
Members of the Scottish Parliament 2021–2026
Female members of the Scottish Parliament
Scottish Conservative Party councillors
Councillors in North Lanarkshire
Women councillors in Scotland